Anna Amalia von Helvig (August 16, 1776 – September 17, 1831) was a German and Swedish artist, writer, translator, socialite, Salonist and culture personality. She is known as an inspiration for many artists. She was a member of the Royal Swedish Academy of Arts.

Biography 
She was born to Baron Carl Christoph von Imhoff of the aristocratic Imhoff family and Luise von Schardt, the niece of Charlotte von Stein. In 1791, she was introduced to the court of Charles Augustus, Grand Duke of Saxe-Weimar-Eisenach in Weimar, where she belonged to the court of Charles' mother Anna Amalia of Brunswick-Wolfenbüttel. She was given a good artistic education and was encouraged by Goethe and Schiller to write poems.

Married in 1803 to General Karl Gottfried von Helvig, she moved to Stockholm in 1804, where she established a salon and became a known personality in the capital's cultural life. She was elected to the Academy of Arts in 1804 and took part in several of its exhibitions between 1804 and 1810. She returned to Germany in 1810, but spent the years from 1814 to 1816 in Sweden, where she resided in Uppsala as a part of the circle around the salonist Malla Silfverstolpe. Her friendship with Erik Gustaf Geijer and Per Daniel Amadeus Atterbom has been much discussed, and she is portrayed as a source of inspiration for many artists; she held a correspondence with Swedish artists after she returned to Germany. In Berlin, she established one of the most important literary salons of the early 19th century.

In culture 
Carina Burman portraits the relationship between Amalia von Helvig and Gustaf Geijer in the novel Islandet (2001).

See also 
 Christina Charlotta Cederström
 List of German women artists

References

Sources
 Österberg, Carin et al., Svenska kvinnor: föregångare, nyskapare (Swedish women) Lund: Signum 1990. 
 Svenskt konstnärslexikon (Swedish Art dictionary) Allhems Förlag, Malmö (1952)

Further reading 
 

1776 births
1831 deaths
19th-century German women writers
German socialites
German salon-holders
19th-century Swedish writers
18th-century Swedish writers
18th-century German writers
German women artists
Swedish women artists
18th-century German women writers
19th-century German writers
19th-century Swedish women writers
18th-century Swedish women writers